Aryeh is a transliteration of the Hebrew word אריה, which means lion. It is a common Hebrew masculine given name.

People so named include the following:

Aryeh Altman (1902–1982), Israeli politician
Aryeh Azulai (born 1933), Israeli mayor
Aryeh Bahir (1906–1970), Israeli politician
Aryeh Ben-Eliezer (1913–1970), Revisionist Zionist leader, Irgun member and Israeli politician
Aryeh Leib Bernstein (1708–1788), Chief Rabbi of Galicia
Aryeh Nussbaum Cohen (born 1994), American opera singer
Aryeh Deri (born 1959), Israeli politician and leader of the Shas party
Aryeh Dvoretzky (1916–2008), Russian-born Israeli mathematician, eighth president of the Weizmann Institute of Science
Aryeh Eldad (born 1950), Israeli physician and politician
Aryeh Eliav (1921–2010), Israeli politician
Aryeh Leib Epstein (1708–1775), Polish rabbi
Aryeh Tzvi Frumer (1884–1943), Orthodox rabbi, rosh yeshiva, and posek
Aryeh Gamliel (1951–2021), Israeli politician
Aryeh Leib ben Asher Gunzberg (c. 1695–1785), Lithuanian rabbi and author
Aryeh Leib HaCohen Heller (1745–1812), rabbi, Talmudist and Halachist in Galicia
Aryeh Kaplan (1934–1983), American Orthodox rabbi and author
Aryeh Kasher (1935–2011), Israeli historian and author
Aryeh Levin (1885–1969), Orthodox rabbi
Aryeh Neier (born 1937), American human rights activist
Aryeh Nehemkin (born 1925), Israeli former politician
Aryeh Tartakower (1897–1982), Polish-born Israeli political activist, historian and sociologist

See also
Arie